Ghatal Assembly constituency is an assembly constituency in Paschim Medinipur district in the Indian state of West Bengal. It is reserved for scheduled castes.

Overview
As per orders of the Delimitation Commission, No. 231. Ghatal Assembly constituency (SC) is composed of the following: Ghatal municipality, Ghatal community development block, Ghatal Kharar municipality, and Rajnagar, Sarberia I and Sarberia II gram panchayats of Daspur I community development block.

Ghatal Assembly constituency (SC) is part of No. 32 Ghatal (Lok Sabha constituency). It was earlier part of Arambagh (Lok Sabha constituency).

Election results

2021

2016

2011

  

.# Trinamool Congress did not contest the seat in 2006.

1977-2006
In 2006, 2001, 1996, 1991 and 1987 state assembly elections, Ratan Pakhira of CPI(M) won the 197 Ghatal (SC) assembly seat defeating his nearest rivals, Ayan Dolui of BJP in 2006, Gopal Karak of Trinamool Congress in 2001,  Rajani Kanta Dolui of Congress in 1996, Nimai Bag of Congress in 1991, and Madhu Sudan Dolai in 1987. Contests in most years were multi cornered but only winners and runners are being mentioned. Gopal Mandal of CPI(M) defeated Nimai Bag of Congress in 1982. Gopal Mandal of CPI(M) defeated Baneshwar Saha of Janata Party.

1951-1972
Harisadhan Dolui of Congress won in 1972. Nandarani Dal of CPI(M) won in 1971, 1969 and 1967. Nagen Dolai of CPI won in 1962. In 1957 and 1951 Ghatal had a dual seat. Harendra Nath Dolai and Lakshman Chandra Sarkar, both of Congress won in 1957. Amulya Charan Dal and Jatish Chandra Ghosh, both of CPI, won the Ghatal dual seat in independent India's first election in 1951.

References

Assembly constituencies of West Bengal
Politics of Paschim Medinipur district